HTML email is the use of a subset of HTML to provide formatting and semantic markup capabilities in email that are not available with plain text: Text can be linked without displaying a URL, or breaking long URLs into multiple pieces. Text is wrapped to fit the width of the viewing window, rather than uniformly breaking each line at 78 characters (defined in RFC 5322, which was necessary on older text terminals). It allows in-line inclusion of images, tables, as well as diagrams or mathematical formulae as images, which are otherwise difficult to convey (typically using ASCII art).

Adoption 

Most graphical email clients support HTML email, and many default to it. Many of these clients include both a GUI editor for composing HTML emails and a rendering engine for displaying received HTML emails.

Since its conception, a number of people have vocally opposed all HTML email (and even MIME itself), for a variety of reasons. For instance, the ASCII Ribbon Campaign advocated that all email should be sent in ASCII text format.  The campaign was unsuccessful and was abandoned in 2013. While still considered inappropriate in many newsgroup postings and mailing lists, its adoption for personal and business mail has only increased over time.  Some of those who strongly opposed it when it first came out now see it as mostly harmless.

According to surveys by online marketing companies, adoption of HTML-capable email clients is now nearly universal, with less than 3% reporting that they use text-only clients. The majority of users prefer to receive HTML emails over plain text.

Compatibility 
Email software that complies with RFC 2822 is only required to support plain text, not HTML formatting. Sending HTML formatted emails can therefore lead to problems if the recipient's email client does not support it. In the worst case, the recipient will see the HTML code instead of the intended message.

Among those email clients that do support HTML, some do not render it consistently with W3C specifications, and many HTML emails are not compliant either, which may cause rendering or delivery problems.

In particular, the <head> tag, which is used to house CSS style rules for an entire HTML document, is not well supported, sometimes stripped entirely, causing in-line style declarations to be the de facto standard, even though in-line style declarations are inefficient and fail to take good advantage of HTML's ability to separate style from content. Although workarounds have been developed, this has caused no shortage of frustration among newsletter developers, spawning the grassroots Email Standards Project, which grades email clients on their rendering of an acid test, inspired by those of the Web Standards Project, and lobbies developers to improve their products. To persuade Google to improve rendering in Gmail, for instance, they published a video montage of grimacing web developers, resulting in attention from an employee.

Style 

Some senders may excessively rely upon large, colorful, or distracting fonts, making messages more difficult to read. For those especially bothered by this formatting, some user agents make it possible for the reader to partially override the formatting (for instance, Mozilla Thunderbird allows specifying a minimum font size); however, these capabilities are not globally available. Further, the difference in optical appearance between the sender and the reader can help to differentiate the author of each section, improving readability.

Multi-part formats 

Many email servers are configured to automatically generate a plain text version of a message and send it along with the HTML version, to ensure that it can be read even by text-only email clients, using the Content-Type: multipart/alternative, as specified in RFC 1521. The message itself is of type multipart/alternative, and contains two parts, the first of type text/plain, which is read by text-only clients, and the second with text/html, which is read by HTML-capable clients.  The plain text version may be missing important formatting information, however. (For example, a mathematical equation may lose a superscript and take on an entirely new meaning.)

Many mailing lists deliberately block HTML email, either stripping out the HTML part to just leave the plain text part or rejecting the entire message.

The order of the parts is significant.  RFC1341 states that: In general, user agents that compose multipart/alternative entities should place the body parts in increasing order of preference, that is, with the preferred format last. For multipart emails with html and plain-text versions, that means listing the plain-text version first and the html version after it, otherwise the client may default to showing the plain-text version even though an html version is available.

Message size 

HTML email is larger than plain text.  Even if no special formatting is used, there will be the overhead from the tags used in a minimal HTML document, and if formatting is heavily used it may be much higher.  Multi-part messages, with duplicate copies of the same content in different formats, increase the size even further.  The plain text section of a multi-part message can be retrieved by itself, though, using IMAP's FETCH command.

Although the difference in download time between plain text and mixed message mail (which can be a factor of ten or more) was of concern in the 1990s (when most users were accessing email servers through slow modems), on a modern connection the difference is negligible for most people, especially when compared to images, music files, or other common attachments.

Security vulnerabilities 

HTML allows a link to be displayed as arbitrary text, so that rather than displaying the full URL, a link may show only part of it or simply a user-friendly target name.  This can be used in phishing attacks, in which users are fooled into believing that a link points to the website of an authoritative source (such as a bank), visiting it, and unintentionally revealing personal details (like bank account numbers) to a scammer.

If an email contains web bugs (inline content from an external server, such as a picture), the server can alert a third party that the email has been opened.  This is a potential privacy risk, revealing that an email address is real (so that it can be targeted in the future) and revealing when the message was read.

HTML content requires email programs to use engines to parse, render and display the document. This can lead to more security vulnerabilities, denial of service or low performance on older computers.

During periods of increased network threats, the US Department of Defense converts all incoming HTML email to text email.

The multipart type is intended to show the same content in different ways, but this is sometimes abused; some email spam takes advantage of the format to trick spam filters into believing that the message is legitimate.  They do this by including innocuous content in the text part of the message and putting the spam in the HTML part (that which is displayed to the user).

Most email spam is sent in HTML for these reasons, so spam filters sometimes give higher spam scores to HTML messages.

In 2018 EFAIL was unveiled, a severe vulnerability which could disclose the actual content of encrypted HTML emails to an attacker.

See also 
 Enriched text – an HTML-like system for email using MIME
 Email production

References 

Email
Internet terminology
HTML